Common names: meadow viper, Ursini's viper, meadow adder, (more).

Vipera ursinii is a species of venomous snake in the subfamily Viperinae of the family Viperidae. It is a very rare species, which is in danger of extinction. This species is commonly called the meadow viper. It is found in France, Italy, and Greece as well as much of eastern Europe. Several subspecies are recognized. Beyond the highly threatened European population, poorly known populations exist as far to the east as Kazakhstan and northwestern China.

Etymology
The specific name or epithet, ursinii, is in honor of Italian naturalist Antonio Orsini (1788–1870).

Description
Females are larger than males. Although sometimes confused with V. aspis or V. berus, it differs from them in the following characters. The smallest viper in Europe, its body is thick, its head narrow, and its appearance rough. The snout is not upturned. There are always several large scales or plates on the top of the head. The prominently keeled dorsal scales are in only 19 rows, and often dark skin shows between them. It is gray, tan, or yellowish with a dark undulating dorsal stripe, which is edged with black.

Common names
Meadow viper, Ursini's viper, meadow adder, Orsini's viper, field viper, field adder. Although the following subspecies are currently invalid according to the taxonomy used here, their common names may still be encountered:

 V. u. ursinii – Italian meadow viper.
 V. u. macrops – karst viper, karst adder.
 V. u. rakosiensis – Danubian meadow viper.
 V. renardi – steppe viper, steppe adder, Renard's viper.
 V. u. moldavica – Moldavian meadow viper.

Geographic range
Southeastern France, eastern Austria (extinct), Hungary, central Italy, Serbia, Montenegro, Croatia, Bosnia and Herzegovina, northern and northeastern Republic of Kosovo, North Macedonia, Albania, Romania, northern Bulgaria, Greece, Turkey, northwestern Iran, Armenia, Azerbaijan, Georgia, Russia and across Kazakhstan, Kyrgyzstan and eastern Uzbekistan steppes to China (Xinjiang).

Vipera ursinii rakosiensis is native to Hungary although the taxonomic status of this subspecies is disputed (see section "Taxonomy")

The type locality is " ...monti dell'Abruzzo prossimi alla provincia d'Ascoli... " (...mountains of Abruzzo near the  Province of Ascoli Piceno, Italy...).

Conservation status
The species Vipera ursinii is considered to be a Vulnerable species on the IUCN Red List of Threatened Species, due to habitat destruction caused by changes in agricultural practices and climate change in mountain areas, and to collection for the pet trade.

In addition, this species is listed on CITES Appendix I, which prohibits commercial international trade, and is a strictly protected species (Appendix II) under the Berne Convention.

V. ursinii is the most threatened snake in Europe. At least 12 human activities are threatening these animals:
1. Grazing 
2. Mowing
3. Fire
4. Agriculture
5. Roads
6. Constructions
7. Leisure Activities
8. Afforestation 
9. Cynegetic species management
10. Persecution
11. Illegal collection
12. Littering

Taxonomy
There is high genetic diversity within samples of Vipera ursinii and several species may be involved. At least six subspecies may be encountered in modern literature:

 Vipera ursinii ursinii (Bonaparte, 1835)
 Vipera ursinii eriwanensis (A.F. Reuss, 1933)
 Vipera ursinii graeca Nilson & Andrén, 1988
 Vipera ursinii macrops Méhelÿ, 1911
 Vipera ursinii moldavica Nilson, Andrén & Joger, 1993
 Vipera ursinii rakosiensis Méhely, 1893
 Vipera ursinii renardi Christoph, 1861

Golay et al. (1993) recognize the first four, while Mallow et al. (2003) recognize five and list V. eriwanensis and V. renardi as valid species. However, McDiarmid et al. (1999), and thus ITIS, feel that more definitive data is necessary before any subspecies can be recognized.

Notes

References

Further reading

Golay P, Smith HM, Broadley DG, Dixon JR, McCarthy CJ, Rage J-C, Schätti B, Toriba M (1993). Endoglyphs and Other Major Venomous Snakes of the World: A Checklist. Geneva: Azemiops. 
Latifi M (1991). The Snakes of Iran. Oxford, Ohio: Society for the Study of Amphibians and Reptiles. . (Vipera ursinii, p. 133.)

External links

Meadow viper (Vipera ursinii ) at ARKive. Accessed 5 October 2006.
Vipera ursinii  at Amphibians and Reptiles of Europe. Accessed 9 October 2006.
Orsini's viper, Vipera ursinii at Reptiles & Amphibians of France. Accessed 30 October 2006.

Vipera eriwanensis at Checklist of Armenia's Amphibians and Reptiles, Tadevosyan's Herpetological Resources. Accessed 30 March 2007.

ursinii
Reptiles of Europe
Reptiles of Central Asia
Reptiles of Azerbaijan
Reptiles described in 1835
Taxa named by Charles Lucien Bonaparte